The Camil Gélinas Trophy has been awarded to the top coach in the Ligue Magnus since 2002. It is named after , a Canadian who played and coached in France for many years.

Winners

External links
 Fédération Française de Hockey sur Glace

Ligue Magnus
France
French ice hockey trophies and awards